The 1975 UCI Juniors Track World Championships were the first annual Junior World Championship for track cycling held in Lausanne, Switzerland.

The Championships had four events for men only, Sprint, Points race, Individual pursuit and Team pursuit.

Events

Medal table

References

UCI Juniors Track World Championships
1975 in track cycling
Track cycling
International cycle races hosted by Switzerland